PY, Py, py or P-Y may stand for:

People
 Eugène Py, a French cinema pioneer of the Cinema of Argentina
 Olivier Py, a French stage director, actor and writer
 Delphine Py-Bilot, a French triathlete
 Piye, a Kushite king and founder of the Twenty-fifth dynasty of Egypt
 Pierre-Yves Gerbeau, French businessman

Science and technology
 Python (programming language), which uses the filename extension '.py'
 .py, the country code top level domain (ccTLD) for Paraguay
 py (unit), a Korean unit of floorspace area
 Py (cipher), a stream cipher designed by Eli Biham and Jennifer Seberry
 p-y method, for assessing the load-bearing abilities of deep foundations
 Permalloy, a nickel-iron magnetic alloy
 Pyridine, a common monodentate ligand in coordination chemistry, abbreviated as 'py'

Other uses
 Py, Pyrénées-Orientales, a commune of the Pyrénées-Orientales département in southwestern France
 Pack year, a measure of cigarette smoking
 Paraguay, ISO 3166-1 country code
 Pinyin, a system of romanization (phonetic notation and transliteration to Roman script) for Mandarin Chinese
 Portsmouth yardstick, used as a rating system in yacht racing and dinghy racing
 Surinam Airways (IATA airline designator PY)